"None of Your Business" is the third single released from Salt-n-Pepa's fourth studio album, Very Necessary. It was written and produced by Hurby Azor and earned the group its first Grammy Award.

The song is included on the 1996 Barb Wire and 2000 Miss Congeniality soundtracks.

Critical reception
Alan Jones from Music Week wrote, "A rap/metal hybrid that has no problem appealing to the head nodding, air guitar crowd, as the girls are carried along on fat guitar riffs. The Perfecto remix miraculously returns the girls to their dance roots, making this truly a barrier-buster."

Awards
"None of Your Business" was nominated for 'Best Dance Video' and 'Best Choreography' at the 1995 MTV Video Music Awards, but lost out to Scream by Michael Jackson and Janet Jackson for both awards.

"None of Your Business" was nominated and won the award for Best Rap Performance by a Duo or Group at the 37th Annual Grammy Awards. Prior to the win, the group had been nominated for this award twice; in 1989 with "Push It" and 1992 with "Let's Talk About Sex".

Cheryl later 'disowned that song for its sexually salacious content', was at that stage so unwell, that the win was merely a 'hollow triumph'. "It was exciting on one level, but all I remember of that time was, I was severely bulimic and caught up in the whole 'skinny is beautiful' thing, and I felt so empty when I should have been elated, I suppose."   "My career was peaking at the same time my personal life was at an all time low. You always think when you're young that success is measured in these certain terms, but the reality is a Grammy's never gonna fill the void I felt when I was bulimic."

Impact
In a 20-year review of the track, Sarah Oakes of Daily Life said the song has "aged far more like a good wine than the alcopop that got you on the dance floor in the first place." She continued "'None Of Your Business' is a fist-pumping, anti slut-shaming anthem a solid decade before the term was ever used in the mainstream. It is a war cry for women against the people and institutions that judge them for having sex, enjoying sex or expressing their sexuality with an I-do-not-give-a-shit attitude that is as infectious as its bass line. I feel like if 'None Of Your Business' was released today, it would go viral in an instant . What makes Salt N Pepa so bold is that they independently chose to flip the script. They behaved like they were as empowered as the male rappers. They wore sexy clothing, talked about enjoying casual sex, they objectified men, and across many tracks directly addressed the way women were/are shamed for promiscuous behaviours." She concluded with "On the 20th anniversary of their Grammy for 'None Of Your Business', I don't think it's an overstatement to call these women visionaries and we need more like them."

Track listings and formats
CD-Maxi – double A-side single (with Heaven 'n Hell)
 "None of Your Business" (Muggs Metal Mix) – 3:36	
 "None of Your Business" (Perfecto Mix) – 3:24	
 "Shoop" (Ben Liebrand Mix) – 3:59	
 "Heaven 'n Hell" (Carron Hall Mix) – 4:19	
 		 	 
CD-Maxi – remixes 
 "None of Your Business" (Perfecto Radio Mix) – 3:23	
 "None of Your Business" (Muggs Mix) – 4:00	
 "None of Your Business" (Ghetto Lab Mix) – 4:23	
 "None of Your Business" (Album Mix) – 3:32

Charts

Cover version
During the closing credits of the Bob's Burgers episode "Nightmare on Ocean Avenue Street", the Belcher children sing the song with new lyrics that focus on eating Halloween candy.

References

1993 songs
1994 singles
Salt-N-Pepa songs
London Records singles
Songs with feminist themes
Songs written by Hurby Azor